Hacılı is a village in the Pülümür District, Tunceli Province, Turkey. The village is populated by Kurds and had a population of 26 in 2021.

References 

Kurdish settlements in Tunceli Province
Villages in Pülümür District